Formula One (F1) is the highest class of open-wheeled motor racing defined by the Fédération Internationale de l'Automobile (FIA), motorsport's world governing body. The "formula" in the name refers to a set of rules to which all participants and cars must conform. Each winner is presented with a trophy and the results of each race are combined to determine two annual Championships, one for drivers and one for constructors. The World Championship for Drivers is held since 1950, after the Formula One standard was agreed upon in 1946. The Constructors' Championship was added for the 1958 season and has been awarded ever since.

Lewis Hamilton holds the record for the most race wins in Formula One history, with  wins to date. Michael Schumacher, the previous record holder, is second with 91 wins, and Sebastian Vettel is third with 53 victories. Kimi Räikkönen holds the distinction of having the longest time between his first win and his last.

Three , the 1951 French, the 1956 Argentine and the 1957 British Grand Prix, were won by two drivers sharing a car.

By driver

By nationality

Most wins per season

 Season still in progress.

Most Grand Prix wins per season by driver

See also
List of Formula One Grand Prix winners (constructors)
List of Formula One polesitters

References

General

Specific

Bibliography

External links
 
 

Winners Grand Prix